Buckeye is an unincorporated community in Dickinson County, Kansas, United States.

History
Buckeye was started as a colony/settlement by  Universalist preacher Vear P. Wilson.  Buckeye colony had nearly two hundred settlers and a church built by 1870.

Buckeye had a post office from 1900 until 1904.

Education
The community is served by Chapman USD 473 public school district.

References

Further reading

External links
 Buckeye Colony Bibliography Kansas Historical Society
 Dickinson County maps: Current, Historic, KDOT

Unincorporated communities in Dickinson County, Kansas
Unincorporated communities in Kansas
1900 establishments in Kansas